Chaudhary Baldev Singh, Advocate (1889–1976) also known as Master Baldev Singh was an Indian politician, Freedom Fighter -  Member of Legislative Council (MLC) -  Member of Legislative Assembly (MLA) - Pioneer of Education in Haryana-Founder of Jat Educational Societies in North India - Arya Samajist - Gandhian - Believer in Economic Upliftment

The Jat Association was founded under his aegis in Rohtak in 1913.

References 

1889 births
1976 deaths
Members of the Haryana Legislative Assembly